Richard Shelby Peek (October 28, 1943 – February 16, 2014)  was an American professional basketball player. Although he was drafted by the NBA's Baltimore Bullets in 1967, Peek played in the American Basketball Association (ABA) for the Dallas Chaparrals. In 51 career games, he averaged 4.6 points and 3.9 rebounds per game.

References

1943 births
2014 deaths
American men's basketball players
Baltimore Bullets (1963–1973) draft picks
Basketball players from Miami
Centers (basketball)
Dallas Chaparrals players
Florida Gators men's basketball players
Louisiana Tech Bulldogs basketball players
Sportspeople from Pensacola, Florida